Jerome (Jerry) Conway (born 22 April 1937) is a Canadian former yacht racer who competed in the 1959 Chicago Pan American Games (silver medal) and the 1960 Rome (Naples) Summer Olympics in the 5.5 meter class.

Conway was born  in Toronto, Ontario. He received his education at St. Andrew's College (Aurora, Ontario), the University of Toronto (B.A.,M.A., Psychology), and Indiana University, Bloomington Indiana (PhD, Mass Communications).

Conway's family members helped to establish a Jewish Yacht Club in Toronto (Island Yacht Club) in the early 1950's and he was active on its Board in creating Junior Sailing and Racing Programs.

Conway met his future wife (Brenda Conway, nee Freeman) at the Island Yacht Club and she and their daughters (Jillian and Lesley) became his regular crew in club racing.

References

1937 births
Living people
Sportspeople from Toronto
Canadian male sailors (sport)
Olympic sailors of Canada
Sailors at the 1960 Summer Olympics – 5.5 Metre